German submarine U-1055 was a Type VIIC U-boat built for Nazi Germany's Kriegsmarine for service during World War II.
She was laid down on 30 March 1943 by Friedrich Krupp Germaniawerft, Kiel as yard number 689, launched on 9 March 1944 and commissioned on 8 April 1944 under Oberleutnant zur See Rudolf Meyer.

She was fitted with a Schnorchel underwater breathing apparatus in November 1944.

Design
German Type VIIC submarines were preceded by the shorter Type VIIB submarines. U-1055 had a displacement of  when at the surface and  while submerged. She had two shafts and two  propellers.

U-1055 was fitted with five  torpedo tubes (four fitted at the bow and one at the stern), fourteen torpedoes, one  SK C/35 naval gun, (220 rounds), one  Flak M42 and two twin  C/30 anti-aircraft guns. The boat had a complement of between forty-four and sixty.

Service history
The boat's career began with training at 5th U-boat Flotilla on 8 April 1944, followed by active service on 1 December 1944 as part of the 11th Flotilla for the remainder of her service.

Fate
On 6 April 1945 U-1055 was attacked by MTB-715 and MTB-719; apparently undamaged
U-1055 went missing on 23 April 1945 in the North Atlantic with no explanation after sending a message while en route to the English Channel. All hands were lost.

Summary of raiding history

References

Bibliography

External links

German Type VIIC submarines
1944 ships
U-boats commissioned in 1944
Missing U-boats of World War II
U-boats sunk in 1945
World War II shipwrecks in the Atlantic Ocean
World War II submarines of Germany
Ships built in Kiel
U-boats sunk by unknown causes
Maritime incidents in April 1945